Marnix Kappers (8 September 1943 – 10 October 2016) was a Dutch cabaret artist and actor, best known for his roles on De Familie Knots (1980), Zonder Ernst (1992), and Heerlijk duurt het langst (1998).

Cabaret
In 1966, Kappers won the Camarettenfestival with cabaret group Déjà Vu and a year later he won the Personality Award at the same festival. He worked with Wim Kan and was part of Ivo de Wijs' cabaret group from 1978 to 1980.

Television
He played in various youth series on Dutch television, notably Kunt u mij de weg naar Hamelen vertellen, mijnheer?, Heerlijk duurt het langst, and De Familie Knots. During the 1990s he co-hosted Knoop in je Zakdoek with Sylvia Millecam, a TV-show for the mentally-challenged. He also provided the Dutch voice of Postman Pat. and appeared in lottery-commercials. His final appearance was in the 2010-edition of the Sinterklaasjournaal; he played a locksmith.

Personal life
Kappers had a long-term relationship with dancer  who died in 2013. Kappers himself died in October 2016, with his family stating he was still shocked by the death of Kuipers and while battling severe health problems "could not cope with more sad twists of fate."

References

External links

1943 births
2016 suicides
Dutch cabaret performers
Dutch male voice actors
Dutch male television actors
Dutch gay actors
LGBT cabaret performers
People from Zwolle
Suicides in the Netherlands
2016 deaths
20th-century Dutch people